10046 Creighton, provisional designation , is a carbonaceous background asteroid from the inner regions of the asteroid belt, approximately  in diameter. It was discovered on 2 May 1986, by astronomers with the International Near-Earth Asteroid Survey (INAS) at Palomar Observatory, California, in the United States. The C-type asteroid has a rotation period of 6.57 hours. It was named after American architect James M. Creighton.

Orbit and classification 

Creighton is a non-family asteroid from the main belt's background population. It orbits the Sun in the inner main-belt at a distance of 1.8–2.9 AU once every 3 years and 7 months (1,307 days; semi-major axis of 2.34 AU). Its orbit has an eccentricity of 0.24 and an inclination of 8° with respect to the ecliptic. The body's observation arc begins with a precovery taken at the discovering observatory in July 1954, nearly 32 years prior to its official discovery observation.

Physical characteristics 

Creighton has been characterized as a common X-type asteroid by Pan-STARRS photometric survey. It is also characterized as a dark C-type asteroid in the SDSS-MFB (Masi Foglia Binzel) taxonomy.

Rotation period 

In April 2011, a rotational light-curve was obtained for this asteroid from photometric observations by American astronomer Brian Skiff. The light-curve gave a well-defined rotation period of  hours with a brightness variation of 0.68 in magnitude.

Diameter and albedo 

According to the survey carried out by the NEOWISE mission of NASA's Wide-field Infrared Survey Explorer, Creighton measures between 9.80 and 11.15 kilometers in diameter and its surface has an albedo between 0.05 and 0.071.

The Collaborative Asteroid Lightcurve Link derives an albedo of 0.0417 and a diameter of 12.40 kilometers based on an absolute magnitude of 13.6.

Naming 

This minor planet was named after pioneering American architect James M. Creighton (1856–1946), who designed the Old Main building at Arizona State University, and designed and constructed the original road to the summit of Pikes Peak in Colorado. The official naming citation was published by the Minor Planet Center on 2 December 2009.

Notes

References

External links 
 Asteroid Lightcurve Database (LCDB), query form (info )
 Dictionary of Minor Planet Names, Google books
 Discovery Circumstances: Numbered Minor Planets (10001)-(15000) – Minor Planet Center
 
 

010046
010046
Named minor planets
19860502